Glenn Yong (born 10 October 1996) is a Singaporean actor and singer. He debuted on the television screen in 2019 with The Good Fight (致胜出击), and in the movies in 2021 with Ah Girls Go Army. Yong was voted and ranked number 62 of the top 100 most handsome faces in the world on TC Candler and he is also the first and only Singaporean to make it on the TC Candler Global list.

Early life and education 
Glenn Yong was born on 10 October 1996 in Singapore. He is the youngest in the family with an older brother.

Yong attended Peicai Secondary School and Temasek Polytechnic. After National Service, Yong studied at Murdoch University and graduated in October 2020, with a Degree in Marketing.

Career 
In 2019, Yong made his acting debut with a supporting role in The Good Fight (致胜出击) in which he played the younger version of one of the main characters.

In 2020, Yong was cast in the television series Victory Lap (水漾少年) alongside Thailand GMM artiste Earth Pirapat. Yong released his first single 妈妈好 in May 2020.

In September 2021, Yong starred in his breakout role as 孙易安, the male lead role in the musical drama series,  (大大的梦想). Yong's first solo original soundtrack (OST) song, 幸福的未来, was also released in the soundtrack album together with the drama series.

In October 2021, Yong was cast as the male lead for Jack Neo's Ah Girls Go Army with the role of Sergeant Chow, one of the two trainers in the movie.

In March 2022, Yong performed at the National Stadium for "Relay For Life 2022" event organized by Singapore Cancer Society. In May, he was appointed as Singapore Cancer Society's Goodwill Ambassador to raise cancer awareness among the youth.

In June 2022, Yong released his new first English single and music video, UP UP, about his experiences in the entertainment industry since his debut in 2019 and he hopes to encourage and empower people to keep moving up despite the odds. 

With the continuation of Jack Neo's Ah Girls Go Army movie, Ah Girls Go Army Again was released as well with Yong acting as Sergeant Chow in the movie. 

In September 2022, Yong filmed his next movie titled The King of Musang King 《猫山王中王》as one of the lead roles, which was released in early 2023.

In November 2022, Yong performed at the Singapore Indoor Stadium for Sing.浪 Concert 2022 with up to a crowd of 8,000 audiences in total. 

In December 2022, over 320,000 worldwide celebrities and 1800 nominees, Yong was voted and ranked number 62 of the top 100 most handsome faces in the world on TC Candler. Yong is also the first and only Singaporean to make it on the TC Candler Global list.

Discography

Filmography

Television series

Film

Awards and nominations

References 

Singaporean television actors
Singaporean film actors
1996 births
Living people
Murdoch University alumni